Akshay Darekar (born 31 July 1988) is a cricketer who plays for Maharashtra in Indian domestic cricket. He is a slow left-arm orthodox bowler. He has also played for India A cricket team in 2012.

References

External links 

Indian cricketers
Maharashtra cricketers
West Zone cricketers
People from Raigad
1988 births
Living people